Mount Marshall is a prominent peak,  high, standing  southeast of Blizzard Peak in the Marshall Mountains, Queen Alexandra Range, Antarctica. The peak is named in association with the Marshall Mountains, the latter honoring Dr. Eric S. Marshall of the British Antarctic Expedition, 1907–09.

References

Mountains of the Ross Dependency
Shackleton Coast